is a professional Japanese tennis player.

Okamura has career-high WTA rankings of 223 in singles and 229 in doubles. She made her WTA Tour main-draw debut at the 2014 Japan Women's Open, where she received a wildcard entry into the doubles draw, partnering with Kotomi Takahata. They defeated Misaki Doi and Elina Svitolina in the first round, but lost to Darija Jurak and Megan Moulton-Levy in the quarterfinals.

WTA Challenger finals

Doubles: 1 (runner-up)

ITF Circuit finals

Singles: 10 (2 titles, 8 runner–ups)

Doubles: 16 (11 titles, 5 runner–ups)

External links
 
 

1995 births
Living people
Japanese female tennis players
Sportspeople from Okayama
Sportspeople from Tokyo
21st-century Japanese women